In-Public (sometimes written iN-PUBLiC) is an international group of street photographers that operates as a collective. It was established in 2000 by Nick Turpin with the intention of bringing together like minded photographers to hold exhibitions, produce books and conduct workshops and promote street photography.

It was the first international collective of street photographers, its geographically disparate membership facilitated by the Internet. New members were accepted but the recruitment process was "haphazard and organic".

It ended in 2018 but was relaunched in 2020.

History
In-Public was established in 2000 by Nick Turpin. Turpin left the collective in 2018. Its website stated that the collective ended in October 2018 because of a division between its members over the posting by two of them of a computational image and a staged image. Many of the old members formed a new group, UP Photographers.

In April 2020 In-Public's website stated that the group had relaunched, "with a new remit to promote and celebrate photographers who eschew staging and manipulation". The new group included a few from its previous membership, including Turpin.

Notable members

Masters

Members of first incarnation (2000–2018)

Publications

Publications by In-Public
10 – 10 Years of In-Public. London: Nick Turpin, 2010. . Includes an essay by Jonathan Glancey, "Outlandish Harmony"; a foreword by Nick Turpin; and a chapter each by Turpin, Gibson, Bram, Stuart, Morley-Hall, Parke, Autio, Marlow, Fisk, Jorgensen, Melanie Einzig, Ladd, Willett, Gus Powell, Agou, Snoek, Andrews, Solomons, Kelly and Russell.

Publications with significant contributions by multiple In-Public members
Threee. London: Self-published / Hat-Trick Design, 2003. Photographs by Turpin, Gibson and Stuart.
Street Photography Now. London: Thames & Hudson, 2010. . Edited by Sophie Howarth and Stephen McLaren. Includes work by Agou, Autio, Dakowicz, Einzig, Gibson, Hansen, Jorgensen, Marlow, Parke, Gus Powell, Mark Powell, Russell, Snoek, Stuart, Turpin and Willett, and others.
London Street Photography: 1860–2010. London: Museum of London; Stockport: Dewi Lewis, 2011. . Selected from the Museum of London collection by Mike Seaborne and Anna Sparham. Includes work from Bram, Fisk, Gibson, Jorgensen, Russell, Solomons, Stuart and Turpin, and others. Published to accompany an exhibition at the Museum of London.
The Street Photographer's Manual. London: Thames & Hudson, 2014. . By David Gibson. Includes profiles on Stuart, Andrews, Jorgensen, Parke, Marlow, Solomons, Shin and Autio; also includes contributions from Russell, Turpin, Bram, Morley-Hall and Gus Powell, and others.

100 Great Street Photographs. Munich, London, New York: Prestel, 2017. By David Gibson. Includes a commentary on a photograph by each of Agou, Bram, Dakowicz, Hansen, Jorgensen, Kelly, Kool, Kydonakis, Marlow, Noguchi, Parke, Mark Powell, Russell, and Tavepong, as well as others. .

Film
In-Sight (2011). 38 minute documentary directed and edited by Nick Turpin, commissioned by Format for Format International Photography Festival, Derby, 2011. Includes interviews with Turpin, Gibson, Solomons, Bram, Einzig, Powell, Agou, Marlow and Snoek, and shows them at work.

Exhibitions
2002: In-Public.com: Street Photography, Acute Angle Gallery, Bankside, London, June / July 2002. Included the work of seven members of In-Public.
2010: in-public @ 10, Photofusion, Brixton, London, 28 May – 9 July 2010. Travelled to Les Ballades Photographiques de Seyssel, Seyssel, France, 12–23 July 2011, where it also included the film In-Sight (2011) and The French exhibition by Turpin. Photographs by In-Public members Turpin, Gibson, Bram, Stuart, Morley-Hall, Parke, Autio, Fisk, Jorgensen, Marlow, Einzig, Ladd, Willett, Gus Powell, Agou, Snoek, Andrews, Solomons, Kelly and Russell.
2011: London Street Photography: 1860–2010, Museum of London, London, 18 February – 4 September 2011. Travelled to Museum of the City of New York, NY, 27 July – 2 December 2012. Included photographs by In-Public members Bram, Fisk, Gibson, Jorgensen, Russell, Solomons, Stuart and Turpin, and others.
 2011: Derby Museum and Art Gallery, Format International Photography Festival, Derby, UK, 4 March – 3 April 2011. Exhibition of photographs by In-Public members Agou, Andrews, Autio, Bram, Einzig, Fisk, Gibson, Jorgensen, Kelly, Ladd, Morley-Hall, Marlow, Parke, Gus Powell, Turpin, Russell, Snoek, Solomons, Stuart, Willett, and the film In-Sight (2011), commissioned for the festival.
2011: From Distant Streets: Contemporary International Street Photography, Galerie Hertz, Louisville, KY, 2 October – 12 November 2011. Part of Louisville Photo Biennial. Curated by Richard Bram. Included 14 In-Public members, of the 29 photographers included.
2013: iN-PUBLiC: An Exhibition of Street Photography, Thailand Creative and Design Centre, Bangkok, Thailand, February–March 2013. In conjunction with the British Council. Photographs by In-Public members Agou, Andrews, Autio, Bram, Einzig, Fisk, Gibson, Jorgensen, Kelly, Ladd, Morley-Hall, Marlow, Parke, Gus Powell, Turpin, Russell, Snoek, Solomons, Stuart, and Willett.
2013: In Public, Snickarbacken 7, Stockholm, Sweden, 22 May – 26 June 2013. An augmented version of their in-public @ 10 exhibition alongside an exhibition of five Stockholm street photographers organised by Contemporary Urban Photography (CUP). Photographs by In-Public members Agou, Andrews, Autio, Bram, Einzig, Fisk, Gibson, Jorgensen, Kelly, Ladd, Morley-Hall, Marlow, Parke, Gus Powell, Turpin, Russell, Snoek, Solomons, Stuart, and Willett.
2013: Miami Street Photography Festival, Miami, FL, December 2013. In-Public group exhibition along with other collectives STRATA and CALLE 35, and showing of the film In-Sight (2011).
2014: Night of Collectives, Street Parade festival, Paris, 18 November 2014. Also with Strange.rs and Burn My Eye street photography collectives.
2015: The Sharp Eye. In-Public in Mexico, Foto Mexico, Cine Tonalá, Mexico City, Mexico, October–November 2015. Slideshow of photographs by Agou, Andrews, Bram, Dakowicz, Einzig, Fisk, Gibson, Gross, Hansen, Jorgensen, Kelly, Marlow, Morley-Hall, Parke, Gus Powell, Mark Powell, Russell, Snoek, Solomons, Stuart, Turpin, and Amani Willett. Curated by Mark Powell, Carlos Álvarez Montero and Alfredo Esparza.

Collections
The following public collection holds work by In-Public as a group:
Museum of London, London. Holds the work included in the exhibition London Street Photography: 1860–2010, by Bram, Fisk, Gibson, Jorgensen, Russell, Solomons, Stuart and Turpin.

Notes

References

External links

UP Photographers, the group formed by the members that split from In-Public in 2018

Street photographers
Photography organizations
Arts organizations established in 2020
Arts organizations disestablished in 2018
Arts organizations established in 2000